Two-time defending champion Andrew Lapthorne and his partner Dylan Alcott defeated the other nine-time defending champion David Wagner and his partner Bryan Barten in the final, 6–7(5–7), 6–1, [10–6] to win the quad doubles wheelchair tennis title at the 2019 US Open. Alcott completed the Grand Slam and the career Golden Slam with the win.

Seeds

Draw

Bracket

External links 

 Draw

Wheelchair Quad Doubles
U.S. Open, 2019 Quad Doubles